This is a list of current WBC International champions. The International title is one of the World Boxing Council's highest regional championships, below world level and WBC Silver.

See also
List of WBC world champions
List of current WBC Youth world champions

References

External links
WBC official site

Lists of boxing champions
World Boxing Council champions